The 1938 DePaul Blue Demons football team was an American football team that represented DePaul University as an independent during the 1938 college football season. In its second season under head coach Ben Connor, the team compiled a 2–7 record and was outscored by a total of 198 to 118. The team played its home games at Wrigley Field and DePaul Field in Chicago. 

In December 1938, DePaul announced that it was discontinuing its intercollegiate football program.

Schedule

References

DePaul
DePaul Blue Demons football seasons
DePaul Blue Demons football